Sidi Bernoussi is an arrondissement and northeastern suburb of Casablanca, in the Sidi Bernoussi district of the Casablanca-Settat region of Morocco. As of 2004 it had 165,324 inhabitants.

References

Arrondissements of Casablanca